Criminal is a 2004 American crime drama film co-written and directed by Gregory Jacobs and a remake of the Argentine film Nine Queens (2000). It stars John C. Reilly, Diego Luna, Maggie Gyllenhaal, and Maeve Quinlan. The film is a production of Section Eight, the production company of Steven Soderbergh and George Clooney.

Plot
Richard Gaddis is a small-time crook with a penchant for con games. To hook marks, he acts like a well-to-do businessman, dressing like one and driving a Mercedes-Benz S500, believing that one must look like a professional in order to be a successful conman.

Gaddis is searching for a new partner with whom he can perform more sophisticated cons.  He discovers Rodrigo after he sees the young man playing some minor con games in a casino-bar. When Rodrigo is caught, Gaddis acts the part of a vice officer to save him from being arrested. Rodrigo's contribution is a face and naive manner so trustable that he is able to con anyone, while Richard is both completely unprincipled and clever. After several small tests to determine Rodrigo's trustworthiness, he suggests a partnership, to which Rodrigo quickly agrees.

Although Rodrigo distrusts Richard greatly, he agrees to partner him on a gigantic scam, provided he gets a percentage of the money gained to help his ailing father, who is in trouble because of his gambling debts. Richard accepts, and they plan to sell a fraudulent version of a silver certificate currency note to William Hannigan, a rich collector who is in town.

When Hannigan takes a fancy to the uptight Valerie, Gaddis' sister who is a concierge at a hotel, Gaddis is forced to pull her into the scam, the price of which is Richard's admission to their brother Michael that he has cheated him out of his share of their inheritance. The plot twists constantly as each of the characters becomes more deeply invested in the scam, and the ever-deceitful Richard tries to cheat Rodrigo, Valerie and Michael out of their share of the take.

In a twist ending, it is revealed that all the major players involved, including Rodrigo and Hannigan, were playing a "confidence game" against Gaddis from the very beginning, so that Valerie and Michael could rightfully take their share of their inheritance.

Cast
 John C. Reilly as Richard Gaddis
 Diego Luna as Rodrigo
 Maggie Gyllenhaal as Valerie
 Maeve Quinlan as Laura
 Peter Mullan as William Hannigan
 Jonathan Tucker as Michael
 Ellen Geer as Grandma
 Malik Yoba as Frank Hill
 Laura Ceron as Waitress
 Zitto Kazann as Ochoa
 Michael Shannon as Gene

Production

Adaptation 
Criminal is based on the Argentine classic crime film Nine Queens (2000), directed by Fabián Bielinsky. The original story has also been adapted in Hindi as Bluffmaster! (2005), and in Malayalam as Gulumaal: The Escape (2009).

Reception
The film received generally positive reviews from critics and holds a 69% score on Rotten Tomatoes.

References

External links 
 
 
 

2004 films
2004 directorial debut films
2000s crime films
American crime drama films
American remakes of Argentine films
Warner Independent Pictures films
Films about con artists
Films directed by Gregory Jacobs
Films produced by Gregory Jacobs
Films produced by Steven Soderbergh
Films scored by Alex Wurman
Films with screenplays by Steven Soderbergh
2000s English-language films
2000s American films